Dawid Kręt (born 2 August 1988 in Płońsk) is a Polish footballer who plays as a goalkeeper.

Club career 
Dawid Kręt joined Tęcza 34 Płońsk at age 14 and spent one season there, before moving to the youth team of Amica Wronki. During the 2007–2008 season, he signed a contract with Lech Poznań.

External links 
 

1988 births
Living people
People from Płońsk
Sportspeople from Masovian Voivodeship
Polish footballers
Association football goalkeepers
Amica Wronki players
Lech Poznań players
Tur Turek players
Jeziorak Iława players
Polonia Słubice players